Return to Metalopolis is the first studio album by former Megadeth guitarist Chris Poland, released in 1990 through Enigma Records (United States) and Pony Canyon (Japan); a remastered edition containing two bonus tracks was reissued through Lion Music in 2002. In 2020, a remastered 30th anniversary edition was released by Combat Records, featuring several bonus tracks, including four new songs, plus several tracks from the out of print Return to Metalopolis Live LP, recorded with the original album lineup at The Mason Jar, in Phoenix, Arizona. The reissue also features liner notes from Poland, as well as producer Randy Burns.

Critical reception

Andy Hinds at AllMusic gave Return to Metalopolis four stars out of five, calling it a "lean, muscular instrumental album." Praise was given to Poland's unique guitar tone, and his "fluid, tasteful, technically exciting, and totally recognizable" soloing.

Track listing

Personnel
Chris Poland – guitar, electric sitar, bass, mixing, pre-production, production
Mark Poland – drums, pre-production
Scott Menzies – gong
Randy Burns – engineering, mixing, production
Steve Heinke – engineering, mixing
Jason Roberts – engineering
Greg Fulginiti – mastering

References

External links
CP Solo Discs at chrispoland.com
Chris Poland "Return To Metalopolis 2002" at Guitar Nine Records (archived)

Chris Poland albums
1990 debut albums
Enigma Records albums